Roger MacDougall (2 August 1910, in Glasgow – 27 May 1993) was a Scottish playwright, screenwriter and director.

Biography 
MacDougall began writing the occasional screenplay in the late 30s, working both alone and in collaboration with others. Most of his plays were produced during the 50s. As a screenwriter, his best-known films are The Man in the White Suit (for which he received a 1952 Academy Award nomination) and The Mouse That Roared. He was a cousin of Alexander Mackendrick.

His 1952 play Escapade enjoyed a lengthy run in the West End and was subsequently adapted into a film of the same title.

The Roger MacDougall diet
In 1953, he was diagnosed with multiple sclerosis which eventually resulted in significant disability. 

Through disillusionment with orthodox medical treatments at the time, he developed a diet, loosely based on a paleolithic diet, that apparently returned him to good health and sustained remission. Following this experience, he published a pamphlet describing his diet intended to help other patients to achieve similar results.

Selected filmography
 Midnight at Madame Tussaud's (1936)
 Midnight Menace (1937)
 Cheer Boys Cheer (1939)
 Let's Be Famous (1939)
 Law and Disorder (1940)

Selected plays
 The Gentle Gunman (1950)
 To Dorothy, a Son (1950)
 Macadam and Eve (1950)
 Escapade (1952)

References

External links

My Fight Against Multiple Sclerosis By Roger MacDougall

1910 births
1993 deaths
Scottish dramatists and playwrights
Scottish screenwriters
Scottish film directors
People with multiple sclerosis
20th-century British dramatists and playwrights
Writers from Glasgow
20th-century British screenwriters